The English women's cricket team toured Sri Lanka and India in November and December 2005. Against Sri Lanka, they played two One Day Internationals, winning the series 2–0. Against India, they played one Test match and 5 ODIs. The Test match was drawn, whilst India won the ODI series 4–1.

Tour of Sri Lanka

Squads

WODI Series

1st ODI

2nd ODI

Tour of India

Squads

Tour Matches

50-over match: India Under-21s v England

50-over match: India Under-21s v England

Only Test

WODI Series

1st ODI

2nd ODI

3rd ODI

4th ODI

5th ODI

References

External links
England Women tour of Sri Lanka and India 2005/06 from Cricinfo

International cricket competitions in 2005
India and Sri Lanka
Women's international cricket tours of India
Women's international cricket tours of Sri Lanka
2005 in women's cricket